"Radioactivity" (German: "Radioaktivität") is a song by the German electronic music band Kraftwerk. It was released in May 1976 as the only single from their fifth studio album, Radio-Activity (1975).

The song was a commercial success in France, but was not as successful in other countries as Kraftwerk's previous hit single "Autobahn".

Composition

The original recording features a Minimoog bass line playing eighth notes. Morse code signals spelling out radioactivity are also present, near the beginning of the track and again near the end. The second time the message continues with is in the air for you and me.

The song was re-recorded as a radically different version for The Mix album in 1991 and was issued as a single in an edited form with remixes by François Kevorkian and William Orbit. The 1991 version drops all references to radio and incorporates additional lyrics with a pointed anti-nuclear theme, remaking the central lyrical hook as “stop radioactivity” and also referring to “contaminated population” and mentioning by name Chernobyl, Harrisburg, Sellafield and Hiroshima.

Live performances 
"Radioactivity" has remained a regular part of Kraftwerk's live sets over the years. On its original performances in 1976, the band tried out an experimental light-beam operated "percussion cage", during which Wolfgang Flür attempted to trigger electronic drum sounds by interrupting light beams using arm gestures. This system frequently failed.

The band performed the Mix version at the "Stop Sellafield" concert in 1992. The song was performed during Kraftwerk's set at Coachella to commemorate the anniversary of the Chernobyl incident on 26 April (the date of the band's performance). Live versions of "Radioactivity" feature on both English and German versions of the band's 2005 live album Minimum-Maximum.

In 2012, Kraftwerk performed the new remix of "Radioactivity" during No Nukes 2012, held in Japan. To commemorate the Fukushima Daiichi nuclear disaster, Hütter sang alternate lyrics to the song in Japanese. The new lyrics were translated into Japanese language by Ryuichi Sakamoto, and make direct reference to Fukushima. This version of the song also has notable lyric changes such as "Chernobyl, Harrisburg, Sellafield, Fukushima". This altered version of the song is also the version Kraftwerk performs live to this day, albeit with the second chorus switching back to the English or German lyrics sung on the Mix version, depending on where they perform. This version also appears on the band's 2017 live album 3-D The Catalogue.

Reception
"Radioactivity" is widely regarded as one of Kraftwerk's best songs. In 2020, Billboard and The Guardian ranked the song number five and number two, respectively, on their lists of the greatest Kraftwerk songs.

Appearances in other media 
The song appeared in Rainer Werner Fassbinder's films Chinese Roulette and Berlin Alexanderplatz, Michael Jupp's animated film Alice in Galaxy and the 2010 documentary Into Eternity.

The song, as did other songs from Radio-Activity, appeared in the Brazilian telenovela Saramandaia.

Track listing

Charts

Weekly charts

Certifications and sales

1991 re-issue 

"Radioactivity" was re-issued 1991 as a single from Kraftwerk's remix album The Mix, featuring remixes by François Kevorkian and William Orbit. The song's new lyrics turn it into an anti-nuclear protest song, with references to the Hiroshima bombing, Three Mile Island (Harrisburg), Chernobyl, and Sellafield.

Track listing

7-inch single

12-inch single

CD single

Cassette single

Charts

Weekly charts

Fatboy Slim version 

Fatboy Slim covered "Radioactivity" for the closing track of his compilation album Late Night Tales: Fatboy Slim. It featured vocals contributed by a woman from his favorite record store. The song was released as a limited edition 7-inch single.

Track listing

7-inch single

References 

Kraftwerk songs
1976 singles
Fatboy Slim songs
2007 singles
2007 songs
Songs written by Florian Schneider
Songs written by Ralf Hütter
Songs written by Emil Schult
Songs about radio
Songs about science
Electronic songs
Protest songs
1975 songs
1991 singles
1991 songs
Songs written by William Orbit